The Romani Egyptian commando ambush was a battle waged on the morning of the second day of the Yom Kippur War, between the Egyptian military and the Israel Defense Forces in the northern section of the Sinai front, near the town of Romani. It was the Egyptians' most significant attempt to delay the arrival of the IDF's reserve forces at the front. It was also the first battle of the war in which IDF reserve forces took part and the first battle waged by the IDF's 162 Division.

Sources
 Avraham Adan,On both sides of the suez, Jerusalem: idanim, 1979
 Heitan Haber, Zeev Schiff, Lexicon of the Yom Kippur War, Or Yehoda: Zemora-Bitan, Devir, 2003
 Elyashiv Shimshi,The power to decide: the division commanders on the battlefield, Tel Aviv: Ministry of Defense, 2007.

References

Battles of the Yom Kippur War
Ambushes